Sopressa  is an Italian aged salami, produced with pork, lard, salt, pepper, spices and garlic. It is a typical product of Veneto, in northern Italy.

The sopressa is a salami, typical of the Venetian culinary tradition and for this reason there are various types (such as sopressa Treviso), Sopressa Vicentina, produced in the province of Vicenza, has been awarded the Protected Geographical Status by the European Union. Moreover, in the site of Veneto Region you can view the production specification of this product (divided into eight articles).

In order to protect Soprèssa Vicentina from easy counterfeiting and for greater consumer protection, the "Consorzio di Tutela della Soprèssa Vicentina DOP" has emerged, which brings together 4 local producers scattered around Vicenza.

Cuisine of Veneto
Italian products with protected designation of origin
Italian sausages